Sniff is a 2017 Indian Hindi-language action adventure film, written and directed by Amole Gupte, under the banner of Trinity Pictures.

Khushmeet Gill played the lead role in the film.

Plot
The film is based on a boy who can't smell. Later he gets superpowers of smelling up to 2 kilometres. He solves the crime of car thieves.

Cast
Khushmeet Gill as Sunny Gill 
Monica Sehgal as Bobby
Surekha Sikri as Bebe
Suresh Menon as Mr. Verghese
Sushmita Mukherjee
Rajesh Puri

Production

Development
The official announcement of the film was announced in the first half of September 2016. The title of the film was said to be Sniff.

Casting
The makers of the film have decided to cast Khushmeet Gill in the film.

Filming
The principal photography of the film commenced in September 2016.

Release 
The Hindu wrote that "Simple it might be but simplistic it certainly is not".

References

2017 films
Indian children's films
2010s action adventure films
Indian action adventure films
2010s Hindi-language films
Films set in Mumbai
2010s Indian superhero films
Indian superhero films